was a Japanese actor. He appeared in more than sixty films from 1960 to 1982.

Career
Following his older brother, Jo Shishido, Gō joined the Nikkatsu studio in 1960 and made his film debut in The Warped Ones. He often played villains on both film and television. In 1978, he married the singer Naomi Chiaki and later retired from acting to run a talent agency.

Filmography

References

External links
 

1937 births
1992 deaths
People from Osaka
Japanese male film actors